Being is a 1974 album by the Finnish progressive rock group Wigwam.

Track listing

References

External links 
 Album information at Wigwam Nuclear Netclub
 Lyrics

1974 albums
Wigwam (Finnish band) albums